Jansenella is a genus of Asian plants in the grass family.

 Species
 Jansenella griffithiana (C.Muell.) Bor - India, Sri Lanka, Myanmar
 Jansenella neglecta S.R.Yadav, Chivalkar & Gosavi - Maharashtra

References

Panicoideae
Poaceae genera